William Goodwin may refer to:

 William Goodwin (priest) (died 1620), English academic and Anglican Dean of Christ Church
 William Watson Goodwin (1831–1912), American classical scholar
 William S. Goodwin (1866–1937), U.S. Representative from Arkansas
 W. A. R. Goodwin (William Archer Rutherfoord Goodwin, 1869–1939), American Episcopal clergy
 Billy Goodwin (1892–1951), English footballer with Manchester United
 Bill Goodwin (Welsh footballer) (1892–1972), footballer with Crewe Alexandra F.C.
 William Nelson Goodwin (1909–1975), U.S. federal judge 
 Bill Goodwin (1910–1958), American radio presenter
 Bill Goodwin (jazz drummer) (born 1942), American musician
 Will Goodwin (footballer), English footballer

See also
 William Gradwell-Goodwin (died 1942), mayor of Newcastle-under-Lyme, Staffordshire, England